The Pilgrim Academy is a private Christian school located in Egg Harbor City, New Jersey. Founded by Dr. Warren Allem in 1971, the school teaches children from kindergarten through twelfth grade. The school is accredited by the American Association of Christian Schools through September 2021. The school is also part of the Garden State Association of Christian Schools.

As of the 2017–18 school year, the school had an enrollment of 268 students (plus 16 in PreK) and 34 classroom teachers (on an FTE basis), for a student–teacher ratio of 7.9:1. The school's student body was 72.4% (194) White, 9.0% (24) Black, 8.6% (23) Asian, 5.6% (15) Hispanic and 3.7% (10) two or more races.

Extracurricular activities

Sports include competitive soccer, basketball, baseball, and softball. Clubs include Art, Drama, Concert Choir, Handbell Ensemble, two levels of Orchestra, and a variety of religious groups.

Administration
Core members of the school's administration are

Christopher Storr - Headmaster

Former headmasters include Dr. Warren Allem, Robert A. Peterson, John E. Sahl and Dr. Hubert Hartzler.

References

External links
The Pilgrim Academy
Private School Review of The Pilgrim Academy

1971 establishments in New Jersey
Christian schools in New Jersey
Educational institutions established in 1971
Egg Harbor City, New Jersey
Private high schools in Atlantic County, New Jersey
Private K-12 schools in New Jersey
Schools in the Garden State Association of Christian Schools